The 2009–10 women's national hockey team represented Canada at the 2010 Winter Olympic Games. Prior to the games, the national team participated in several tournaments during the 2009–10 season. The team won the gold medal at the 2010 Winter Olympics in Vancouver. The  head coach was Melody Davidson, and she was assisted by Peter Smith and former Vancouver Canucks player Doug Lidster.

News and notes
 April 17, 2009: Dawson Creek, British Columbia was selected to host the National Women's team's conditioning camp from May 25 to June 17. The team was based at the EnCana Events Centre in Dawson Creek for the 24-day camp. Twenty-six players were invited for centralization and were competing for 21 roster spots for the team that would compete in ice hockey at the 2010 Winter Olympics.
 September 1, 2009: Hayley Wickenheiser became the first player on the Canadian women's hockey team to break the 300 career-point barrier Tuesday in Canada's 10-2 win over Finland at the Canada Cup.
 September 21, 2009: The women's team's performance at the 2002 Winter Games was voted by fans as the No. 2 Canadian Olympic Winter Games moment of all time. The 3-2 win over the United States gave Canada its first gold medal in women's hockey, and a measure of revenge for the loss to the Americans four years earlier in Nagano, Japan. The accomplishment will be featured on a Canadian circulation coin to be released on November 17, 2009. The artist of the coin is Jason Bouwman.
 On February 5, Hayley Wickenheiser made news when she put a teenage Dane Phaneuf in a headlock. Phaneuf plays for the Edmonton South Side Athletics, 15 to 17year old boys from the Alberta Midget Hockey League. Phaneuf's older brother, Dion plays in the National Hockey League. The reason for the headlock was that there were concerns about Phaneuf's aggressive play. The video highlight of the headlock made national news.
 Melody Davidson revealed after the gold medal game that the team left the Olympic Village for two exhibition games against the Vancouver Northwest Giants boys AAA midget team during the Olympics. The first game was held the night before the opening ceremonies. The final game was on February 19.
 February 26: The International Olympic Committee announced that it would investigate the after ice celebration of several Canadian women's hockey players. The cause for the investigation is the concern about the use of beer and cigars on the ice in Vancouver. Another cause for concern was 18-year-old Marie-Philip Poulin was drinking alcohol on the ice (the legal drinking age in British Columbia is 19.) The team had been on the ice for more than 70 minutes after the medal ceremony (only media and arena staff were present). The antics drew heavy criticism from within, and outside of, Canada, but also considerable support from Canadian fans..
 February 28: After winning the gold medal, Canada has once again earned the number one ranking in the IIHF Women's World Ranking. Canada's men are also ranked first in the IIHF Men's World Ranking.
 April 12:Meghan Agosta, Jayna Hefford and Cherie Piper were among thirteen Canadian Olympic medallists attending the home opener of the 2010 Toronto Blue Jays season on Monday, April 12 versus the Chicago White Sox. The medallists will enjoy a meet and greet with the Blue Jays players at a pre-game batting practice and participate in the Ceremonial First Pitch.

 June 28:The Canadian men's and women's hockey teams picked up rings commemorating their double gold victory in Vancouver. The rings are diamond-encrusted with the Olympic logo in the centre. The rings were handed out as part of Hockey Canada's "Canada Celebrates" ceremony in the Alberta capital.

Hockey cards
 Various members of the national team are featured in the 2009-10 O-Pee-Chee Hockey Card set, distributed by Upper Deck. The checklist is as follows:

International exhibition games
 January 1: Jayna Hefford scored the only goal in the shootout goal (Charline Labonté stopped all three American shooters) as Canada beat the U.S. by a score of 3-2. Before the match, Hefford was honoured for reaching the 200-game plateau in November. The game was played in front of 16,347 fans at Scotiabank Place. It was the largest Canadian crowd to watch a women's hockey game, surpassing the previous mark of 15,163 set Jan. 26, 1998 at the Calgary Saddledome.

Intrasquad games

Under-22 series
The Canadian national team participated in a three-game series against the Canadian under-22 national team. All games were played at the Father David Bauer Olympic Arena in Calgary, Alberta.

Red and White Games
 The national team competes in intersquad games in Calgary. One team dons red jerseys, while the other team wears white jerseys.

Tournaments
Jayna Hefford has scored 19 goals in 20 games versus boys' midget AAA teams during this pre-Olympic season.

Icebreaker Tournament
 All games were held at Father David Bauer Arena in Calgary.

2009 Canada Cup
 All games were held at General Motors Place in Vancouver, British Columbia.

NWT Midget Series

Alberta Lottery Series

Four Nations Cup
 All games to be held in Finland.

Roster
 December 21: Melody Davidson, head coach of Canada's women's Olympic hockey team, made final cuts to her roster, in preparation for the Olympic Games. The players that were cut included Gillian Ferrari, Jennifer Wakefield, Delaney Collins, Brianne Jenner and Jocelyne Larocque.
 Marie-Philip Poulin is the youngest player on the 2010 Olympic team.

 The following played for Team Canada prior to December 21.

Player stats
 Stats are as of October 2, 2009.

Skaters

Goaltenders
Szabados has faced 116 shots in five games. St-Pierre has faced 85 shots in four games.

 September 3, 2009, was goalie Shannon Szabados' first loss (2-4 versus US). Up to that point, her record was 9-0.

2010 Olympics
In the first three games, Canada took their goal total at the 2010 Games to 41 in three matches.

 February 14: Canada defeated Slovakia by a record-setting score of 18-0 in their opening game of the 2010 Vancouver Olympic Winter Games on Saturday. Jayna Hefford and Meghan Agosta scored three goals each for Canada who set a record for the most lopsided win women's Olympic hockey tournament history. Canada also held the previous record for the biggest blowout, a 16-0 demolition of host Italy at the Torino 2006 Olympic Games. Hefford finished with a game-high six points in front of a crowd of 16,496 at the Canada Hockey Place arena. Slovakia was making their first appearance in the women's tournament as they were promoted to the top level after winning the qualifying event. Slovakia was outshot 67-9.
 International ice hockey chief René Fasel defended the inclusion of women's hockey in the Olympic Games Sunday by stating one-sided blowouts like Canada's 18-0 thrashing of Slovakia were once a part of the men's game. The IIHF president also said hockey fans are going to have to get used to the disparity between superpowers Canada and the US and the rest of the Olympic field until they can develop more female players in non-traditional hockey-playing countries. The Canadian women said they never thought twice Saturday about not running up the score against Slovakia doesn't help their cause. In fact, some players stated they were giving Slovakia a taste of its own medicine as the Slovaks qualification to the Olympics included an 82-0 thumping of hockey newcomer Bulgaria.
 On February 17, Hayley Wickenheiser became the all-time leading Olympic goal scorer as Canada defeated Sweden 13-1. Wickenheiser reached her record total of 16 career Olympic goals by scoring once on Wednesday as Canada followed up their 18-0 win over Slovakia and 10-1 defeat of Switzerland. In addition, Meghan Agosta scored a record third Olympic hat-trick in the match against Sweden to move on to eight goals in this tournament, equalling Danielle Goyette's record for most goals in one Olympic tournament, set in 1998.

Schedule

Olympic statistics

Skaters

Goaltenders

Under-22 team
 The head coach of the under-22 team was Margot Page. She was assisted by Jim Fetter of Wayne State University and Stephanie White of Ryerson University.
 January 10: Vicki Bendus scored a goal and added two assists for the Canadian national women's under-22 team in the gold medal game of the 2010 MLP Cup. Canada defeated Switzerland, 9-0 in Ravensburg, Germany. The Canadian team won all four of their games by a combined score of 24-4, and secured their seventh goal medal in the past eight years. In three games, Bendus, Jesse Scanzano and Bailey Bram (from the Mercyhurst Lakers women's ice hockey team) combined for seven goals and 18 points. Benuds and Bram were tied for the tournament lead in scoring, and Bendus was named the tournament's top forward.

MLP Cup

Under-18 team
 March 1: Hockey Canada announced its roster for the team competing at the third ever IIHF Under 18 Women's World Championships. The head coach is Dan Church and he is assisted by Pierre Alain and Lisa Jordan. The roster includes six players who took part in the 2009 IIHF World Women's Under-18 Championship:
 Jessica Campbell
 Christine Bestland
 Mélodie Daoust
 Laurie Kingsbury
 Jamie Lee Rattray
 Brigette Lacquette
 Jillian Saulnier

Standings

Schedule

Awards and honours
 Olympic Team
 Media All-Star Team
 G – Shannon Szabados
 F – Meghan Agosta
 F – Marie-Philip Poulin
 Olympic MVP – Meghan Agosta (CAN)
 Directorate Awards
 Best Goalkeeper: Shannon Szabados
 Best Forward: Meghan Agosta
 Under-22 team
 Vicki Bendus, Top Forward, 2010 MLP Cup
 Under-18 team
 Jessica Campbell, Tournament MVP
 Brigette Lacquette was named Best Defenceman by the Directorate

See also 
 2010–11 Canada women's national ice hockey team
 Canada women's national ice hockey team

References

External links
 Women's Hockey pages on Hockey Federation website

 
Canada women's national ice hockey team seasons
Canada women
2009–10 in Canadian women's ice hockey